Cribrihabitans neustonicus is a Gram-negative, non-spore-forming, strictly aerobic and motile bacterium from the genus of Cribrihabitans which has been isolated from seawater from Hualien in Taiwan.

References

Rhodobacteraceae
Bacteria described in 2014